Summer is the debut EP by American alternative hip hop sextet Subtle. It was released on A Purple 100 in 2001.

The tracks "Flying Horse Plans", "Eneby Kurs" and "The Teeth Behind the Wheel" also appear on Earthsick, a compilation of material from the group's Season EPs.

Track listing
 "Flying Horse Plans" – 4:12
 "5second Segment" – 0:31
 "Eneby Kurs" – 5:31
 "Been Shelled" – 1:29
 "Boxgod" – 3:53
 "The Teeth Behind the Wheel" – 4:27

References

2001 debut EPs
Subtle (band) albums